The Pac-12 Conference Player of the Year is a baseball award given to the Pac-12 Conference's most outstanding player. From 1978 to 1998, an award was given to the most outstanding player in both the North and South divisions, with both pitchers and position players eligible. After the 1999 season, the divisions were eliminated and the Pac-12 Conference Baseball Pitcher of the Year award was created to honor the most outstanding pitcher.

Key

Winners

1999–present

North Division (1978–1998)

South Division (1978–1998)

Winners by school

Footnotes
 For purposes of this table, the "year joined" reflects the year that each team joined the conference now known as the Pac-12 as currently chartered. Although the Pac-12 claims the Pacific Coast Conference (PCC), founded in 1915, as part of its own history, that conference disbanded in 1959 due to infighting and scandal. That same year, five PCC members established the Athletic Association of Western Universities (AAWU) under a new charter that functions to this day. The Player of the Year Award was not established until 1978, by which time all of the final members of the PCC except for Idaho were reunited in what was then the Pac-8.
 Portland State was an affiliate member of the Pac-10 from 1982 to 1998.
 Gonzaga was an affiliate member of the Pac-10 from 1982 to 1995.
 Oregon discontinued its baseball program after the 1981 season, re-instating it before the 2009 season.

References

Awards established in 1978
Player
NCAA Division I baseball conference players of the year
1978 establishments in the United States